Rommel Agmed Pacheco Marrufo (born 12 July 1986) is a Mexican diver. He was the gold medalist in the 10-meter platform at the 2003 Pan American Games. In the 2004 Summer Olympics he finished in 10th place in the 10-meter platform and 3-meter springboard. In the 2008 Summer Olympics he finished in 8th place in the 10-meter platform.

References

External links

 

Living people
1986 births
Sportspeople from Mérida, Yucatán
Mexican male divers
Olympic divers of Mexico
Divers at the 2004 Summer Olympics
Divers at the 2007 Pan American Games
Divers at the 2008 Summer Olympics
Divers at the 2011 Pan American Games
Divers at the 2015 Pan American Games
Divers at the 2016 Summer Olympics
Pan American Games gold medalists for Mexico
Pan American Games silver medalists for Mexico
Pan American Games medalists in diving
World Aquatics Championships medalists in diving
Universiade medalists in diving
Central American and Caribbean Games silver medalists for Mexico
Central American and Caribbean Games bronze medalists for Mexico
Competitors at the 2006 Central American and Caribbean Games
Competitors at the 2010 Central American and Caribbean Games
Divers at the 2003 Pan American Games
Universiade gold medalists for Mexico
Universiade silver medalists for Mexico
Universiade bronze medalists for Mexico
Central American and Caribbean Games medalists in diving
Medalists at the 2005 Summer Universiade
Medalists at the 2007 Summer Universiade
Medalists at the 2009 Summer Universiade
Medalists at the 2011 Summer Universiade
Medalists at the 2011 Pan American Games
Medalists at the 2015 Pan American Games
Divers at the 2020 Summer Olympics
Members of the Congress of Yucatán
National Action Party (Mexico) politicians
20th-century Mexican people
21st-century Mexican people